Wilber is a surname. Notable people with the surname include:

Bob Wilber (1928–2019), American jazz clarinetist, saxophonist, and band leader
Del Quentin Wilber, American journalist
Del Wilber, American baseball player
Donald Wilber, American author and spy
Doreen Wilber, American archer 
Ken Wilber (born 1949), American writer and major proponent of integral theory
Kyle Wilber (born 1989), American football player

See also
Wilbur (name), surname and given name